Faust 2.0 is a Swedish horror anthology film produced by NjutaFilms. It's a modern spin on the story of Faust, the premise being that people accept the End-user license agreement of iPhone application without reading it through, allowing the Devil to easier trick people into selling their souls for mundane needs.

Cast
Thomas Hedengran as Vincent
Frida Liljevall as Elisabeth
Katarina Bothén as Stark
Peter Stridsberg as Vince
Mattias Redbo as Joel
Ida Linnertorp as Liv
Per Ragnar as Faust
Anders Fager as Gentleman

About
The film was one of the first to be produced by NjutaFilms in 14 years, since Nicolas Debot's short "Facts Are Safety" in 2001. The film premiered at Monsters of Film. The film was not well received by Swedish critics.

References

External links

2010s Swedish-language films
2014 horror films
Swedish horror films
Horror anthology films
2010s Swedish films